is the 26th single by the Japanese girl idol group AKB48, released in Japan on May 23, 2012.

In its first week, the CD single sold 1,616,795 copies according to Oricon and became AKB48's bestselling single. In August 2012, it was certified "2 Million" by RIAJ. On December 30, 2012, the song won the Grand Prix at the 54th Japan Record Awards, making this their second consecutive win for the group.

The single is Atsuko Maeda and Asuka Kuramochi's final senbatsu recording with the group.

Release 

"Manatsu no Sounds Good" comprises various editions released on May 23, 2012.

The first presses of the single came with a ticket to vote in the AKB48 27th Single Senbatsu Election (to choose the members to be featured in the next AKB48's single, to be released in the summer.)

The Type-A edition comes in a CD+DVD set, consisting of six tracks, half of which are off vocal versions, as well as four music videos and a member profile track. The Type-B edition is also a CD+DVD set, composed of the same tracks as Type-A except "Chōdai, Darling!", which is replaced by "Gugutasu no Sora". Both editions are available with an alternative cover on the group's first pressings.

The Theater edition comes in a CD with the same tracks as Type-A but "Chōdai, Darling!", which is replaced by "Kimi no Tame ni Boku Wa".

As of the day of its release, AKB48 shipped a personal record of 2.0 million copies.

Instead releasing a normal MV (which was censored due to references of girls suffering), an alternative dance shot MV was released.

Track listing 
The first two songs on the CD and their off-vocal versions are the same for all editions. The first 3 music videos on the DVD are the same for both Type-A and Type-B.

Type-A

Type-B

Theater Edition

Credits and personnel

"Manatsu no Sounds Good!" 
The title track featured 36 members, the largest number of participants on an AKB48 single title track since "Everyday, Katyusha", which featured 26 members.

It was the first AKB48 single title track appearance for 15 people: Team 4's Maria Abe, Miori Ichikawa, Anna Iriyama, Haruka Shimazaki, Haruka Shimada, Miyu Takeuchi, Karen Iwata, Rena Katō, Rina Kawaei, and Juri Takahashi, SKE48's Yuria Kizaki, Akane Takayanagi, and Kanon Kimoto, NMB48's Eriko Jō & HKT48's Haruka Kodama.

 Team A: Asuka Kuramochi, Haruna Kojima, Rino Sashihara, Mariko Shinoda, Aki Takajō, Minami Takahashi, Atsuko Maeda
 Team K: Tomomi Itano, Yūko Ōshima, Minami Minegishi, Sae Miyazawa, Yui Yokoyama
 Team B: Tomomi Kasai, Yuki Kashiwagi, Rie Kitahara, Mayu Watanabe
 Team 4: Maria Abe, Miori Ichikawa, Anna Iriyama, Haruka Shimazaki, Haruka Shimada, Miyu Takeuchi, Suzuran Yamauchi, Karen Iwata, Rena Katō, Rina Kawaei, Juri Takahashi
 Team S / AKB48 Team K: Jurina Matsui
 Team S: Yuria Kizaki, Rena Matsui
 Team KII: Akane Takayanagi
 Team E: Kanon Kimoto
 Team N / AKB48 Team B: Miyuki Watanabe
 Team N: Sayaka Yamamoto
 Team M: Eriko Jō
 Team H: Haruka Kodama

"Mitsu no Namida" 
Performed by Special Girls
 Team A: Misaki Iwasa, Aika Ōta, Shizuka Ōya, Chisato Nakata, Sayaka Nakaya, Ami Maeda, Natsumi Matsubara
 Team K: Sayaka Akimoto, Mayumi Uchida, Ayaka Umeda, Ayaka Kikuchi, Tomomi Nakatsuka, Moeno Nitō, Misato Nonaka
 Team B: Kana Kobayashi, Mika Komori, Amina Satō, Sumire Satō, Natsuki Satō, Mariya Suzuki, Rina Chikano, Yuka Masuda, Miho Miyazaki
 Team 4: Mina Ōba, Yūka Tano, Mariko Nakamura, Mariya Nagao
 Kenkyūsei: : Rina Izuta, Miyū Ōmori, Natsuki Kojima, Marina Kobayashi, Erena Saeed Yokota, Yukari Sasaki, Wakana Natori, Rina Hirata, Nana Fujita, Tomu Mutō, Ayaka Morikawa

"Chōdai, Darling!" 
 Team A: Rino Sashihara, Mariko Shinoda, Minami Takahashi, Atsuko Maeda
 Team K: Tomomi Itano, Yūko Ōshima
 Team B: Kashiwagi Yuki, Mayu Watanabe
 Team 4: Rena Katō, Haruka Shimazaki

"Gugutasu no Sora" 
Center: Haruka Ishida
 Team A: Haruka Katayama, Asuka Kuramochi, Aki Takajō, Haruka Nakagawa
 Team K: Miku Tanabe, Reina Fujie, Sakiko Matsui, Yui Yokoyama
 Team B: Haruka Ishida, Rie Kitahara, Shihori Suzuki
 Team 4: Shiori Nakamata
 SKE48 Team S: Rena Matsui
 SKE48 Kenkyūsei: Kaori Matsumura
 NMB48 Team N: Yūki Yamaguchi, Sayaka Yamamoto

"Kimi no Tame ni Boku wa..." 
Center: Yūko Ōshima
 Team A: Misaki Iwasa
 Team K: Yūko Ōshima, Sae Miyazawa, Yui Yokoyama
 Team B: Yuki Kashiwagi, Rie Kitahara, Mayu Watanabe
 Team 4: Mariya Nagao

Charts and certifications

Oricon charts

Billboard charts

Certifications

Accolades

JKT48 version 

"" is the fourth released single from the Indonesian idol girl group JKT48. It was released on November 26, 2013.

Promotion and release
The AKB48 sister group JKT48 announced the release of "Manatsu no Sounds Good! - Musim Panas Sounds Good!", an Indonesian version of "Manatsu no Sounds Good!", as its fourth single for November 26, 2013.

Track listing
The single has two editions: Regular Version (CD+DVD) and Theater Version (CD only)

Regular Version

Bonus
 Team J Special Photo
 Team J & Team KIII Photo Group [Member Random]

Theater Version

Bonus
 Trump Card
 Handshake Event Ticket

SNH48 version 
The SNH48 version of this track entitled "盛夏好声音" was released in Summer 2015, and its music video was filmed in March 2015 for 10 days at somewhere in Saipan, United States.

Notes

References

External links 
 "Manatsu no Sounds Good!" Type-A Regular Edition at King Records

2012 singles
AKB48 songs
Songs with lyrics by Yasushi Akimoto
Oricon Weekly number-one singles
Billboard Japan Hot 100 number-one singles
King Records (Japan) singles
2012 songs